Cheryomno-Podgornoye is a rural locality (a selo) in Yeluninsky Selsoviet, Pavlovsky District, Altai Krai, Russia. The population was 270 as of 2013. There are 2 streets.

Geography 
Cheryomno-Podgornoye is located on the Ob River, 24 km northeast of Pavlovsk (the district's administrative centre) by road. Yelunino is the nearest rural locality.

References 

Rural localities in Pavlovsky District, Altai Krai